Widawka is a river, located in central Poland (Łódź Voivodeship, near Bełchatów), a tributary of the Warta. Its length is 95.8 kilometers and its basin's area is 2385 km2.

See also

Rivers of Poland

Rivers of Poland
Rivers of Łódź Voivodeship